The Canon EOS 5D Mark IV is a professional-grade 30.1-megapixel full-frame digital single-lens reflex (DSLR) camera made by Canon.

Succeeding the EOS 5D Mark III, it was announced on 25 August 2016. The Mark IV went on sale in September 2016 with a retail price of $3,499 in the US, £3,599 in the UK, and €4,129 in the Eurozone. As Canon is phasing out its entire DSLR lineup, this is the final model in the EOS 5D series and has effectively been succeeded by the EOS R5 mirrorless camera.

The 5D Mark IV is offered as a body only or in a package with an EF 24-105mm f/4L IS II USM zoom lens or an EF 24-70mm f/4L IS USM zoom lens; at introduction, the suggested retail price was $3,499, with 24-105 f/4L IS II kit $4,599, and with 24-70 f/4L IS kit $4,399.

Features

New features over the EOS 5D Mark III are:
 DCI 4K (4096×2160) with up to 30 fps (29.97 fps) up to 29′59″, with crop 1.64× (compared to full frame) in MOV (4K video: Motion JPEG; Full HD and HD Movie: MPEG4 AVC/H.264*; Audio: Linear PCM), MP4 (Movie: MPEG4 AVC/H.264*; Audio: AAC) *Variable (averaged) bitrate
 Full HD video (1080p) up to 60 fps, HD (720p) up to 120 fps
C-LOG video footage with the C-LOG upgrade applied
 Continuous shooting rate of up to 7.0 frames per second with full autofocus; 4.3 fps in Live View with Servo AF by Dual Pixel CMOS AF
 All AF points support to a maximum aperture of f/8 with EV −3, 61 points high density reticular AF II system including 41 cross-type points, AF area expanded vertically.
 Continuous red illumination of all AF points
 DIGIC 6+ processor
 Intelligent Viewfinder II
 Inherited AI Servo AF III with EOS iTR AF from EOS 7D Mark II and EOS-1D X Mark II
 Built-in GPS used for geotag information and syncing to UTC time: compatible with three satellite navigation systems including GLONASS (Russia), GPS (USA), Michibiki (Japan)
 Standard ISO range 100–32000 (5D Mark III was 100-25600), expandable to ISO 50–102400.
 Anti-flicker feature (introduced with the EOS 7D Mark II and EOS-1D X Mark II) – camera can be set to adjust the moment of exposure to compensate for flickering electric lighting
 A touchscreen LCD, which allows videographers to select the camera's AF point before and during video recording.
 New button under joystick and beneath Quick control dial.
 Wi-Fi/NFC for wireless file transfer (with wireless transmitter)
 Mirror Vibration Control System
 Fine Detail – new Picture Style
 Dual Pixel CMOS AF with Dual Pixel RAW: for bokeh shift, image microadjustments, ghost and flare reduction
 Digital lens optimizer for JPEG shooting, inherited from the EOS-1D X Mark II
 Time-lapse movie features
 900 shot battery life (approx)
 Improved metering system with 150,000-pixel RGB+IR metering sensor and 252-zone metering
 Approx. 100% viewfinder coverage

Upgrades 
On 20 April 2017 Canon issued a press release, announcing the upcoming availability of a C-LOG upgrade for existing EOS 5D Mark IV cameras. Pricing was set at $99 USD and cameras shipping with the feature upgrade pre-installed were announced for July 2017.

In early 2019 Canon released a Voice Tag upgrade for existing EOS 5D Mark IV cameras. Pricing was set at $99 USD.

The upgrades are mutually exclusive, meaning only one upgrade can be applied to any given camera at a time.

References

External links

EOS 5D Mark IV at Canon USA

5D Mark IV
Cameras introduced in 2016
Articles containing video clips
Full-frame DSLR cameras